Erwin Leiser (May 16, 1923 – August 22, 1996) was a German-born Jew and director, writer, and actor.

Born and raised in Berlin, he fled to Sweden at the age of 15 to escape the Nazi Party. He graduated from the University of Lund and worked as a journalist and a drama and literary critic.

He is best known for his 1960 documentary film Mein Kampf, based on Nazi footage from secret archives and depicting Nazi atrocities.  He subsequently made other documentaries both on Nazi Germany and other topics.

In 1967, he was a member of the jury at the Venice Film Festival.

Leiser published the book Nazi Cinema in 1974.

Erwin Leiser was buried in Zürich's Israelitischer Friedhof Oberer Friesenberg.

References

External links
 
 

1923 births
1996 deaths
German documentary filmmakers
Film people from Berlin
Lund University alumni
Jewish emigrants from Nazi Germany to Sweden